The Salvation Army (TSA) is a Protestant church and an international charitable organization headquartered in London, England. The organisation reports a worldwide membership of over 1.7million, comprising soldiers, officers and adherents collectively known as Salvationists. Its founders sought to bring salvation to the poor, destitute, and hungry by meeting both their "physical and spiritual needs". It is present in 133 countries, running charity shops, operating shelters for the homeless and disaster relief, and humanitarian aid to developing countries.

The theology of the Salvation Army is derived from Methodism, although it is distinctive in institution and practice. A distinctive characteristic of the Salvation Army is its use of titles derived from military ranks, such as "lieutenant" or "major". It does not celebrate the rites of Baptism and Holy Communion. However, the Army's doctrine is otherwise typical of holiness churches in the Wesleyan–Arminian tradition. The Army's purposes are "the advancement of the Christian religion... of education, the relief of poverty, and other charitable objects beneficial to society or the community of mankind as a whole".

The Army was founded in 1865 in London by one-time Methodist preacher William Booth and his wife Catherine as the East London Christian Mission, and can trace its origins to the Blind Beggar tavern. In 1878, Booth reorganised the mission, becoming its first General and introducing the military structure which has been retained as a matter of tradition. Its highest priority is its Christian principles. The current international leader of The Salvation Army and chief executive officer (CEO) is General Brian Peddle, who was elected by the High Council of The Salvation Army on 3 August 2018. 

In 2011, Charity Watch rated the Salvation Army an "A−" to an "A", indicating a high level of financial efficiency and organisational transparency. The Salvation Army has received an A-rating from the American Institute of Philanthropy.

The Salvation Army is one of the world's largest providers of social aid, with expenditures including operating costs of $2.6 billion in 2004, helping more than 32 million people in the U.S. alone. In addition to community centres and disaster relief, the organisation does work in refugee camps, especially among displaced people in Africa.  In the United Kingdom, the Salvation Army is no longer the largest nongovernmental provider of social services; however, it still provides a significant service to people in need. The Salvation Army is the fourth largest charity in the United States, with private donations in excess of $2 billion in 2022, and is a member of the American organisation Christian Churches Together.

Ministers

The Salvation Army refers to its ministers as "officers". When acting in their official capacities, they can often be recognised by the colour-coded epaulettes on their white uniform dress shirts. The epaulettes have the letter "S" embroidered on them in white.  Officer ranks include Lieutenant, Captain, Major, Lieutenant Colonel, Colonel, Commissioner, and General. Promotion in rank from Lieutenant to Major depends primarily on years of service.

Officers are given Marching Orders to change ministries within the Salvation Army. Usually, officers are given new marching orders every two to five years and reassigned to different posts, sometimes moving great distances.

The ordination of women is permitted in the Salvation Army. Salvation Army officers were previously allowed to marry only other officers (this rule varied in different countries); but this rule has been relaxed in recent years. Husbands and wives usually share the same rank and have the same or similar assignments. Such officer-couples are then assigned together to act as co-pastors and administer corps, Adult Rehabilitation Centres and such.

As of 2001, the organisation will not appoint homosexual people to posts as ministers, preferring individuals "whose values are consistent with the church's philosophy". (See also  section.) See also LGBT clergy in Christianity.

Facilities

Churches
The Army has churches  throughout the world known as Salvation Army corps that may be used as part of a larger community centre. Traditionally, many corps buildings are alternatively called temples or citadels.

Thrift stores and charity shops

The Salvation Army is well known for its network of thrift stores or charity shops, colloquially referred to as "the Sally Ann" in Canada and the United States, "Salvos Stores" in Australia, and "Sally's" in New Zealand, which raise money for its rehabilitation programs by selling donated used items such as clothing, housewares and toys. Clothing collected by Salvation Army stores that is not sold on location is often sold wholesale on the global second hand clothing market.

The Salvation Army's fundraising shops in the United Kingdom participate in the UK government's Work Programme, a workfare programme where benefit claimants must work for no compensation for 20 to 40 hours per week over periods that can be as long as 6 months.

When items are bought at the Salvation Army thrift stores, part of the proceeds go toward The Salvation Army's emergency relief efforts and programs. Textile items not sold are recycled and turned into other items such as carpet underlay. The Salvation Army also helps their employees by hiring ex-felons, depending on the circumstances, because they believe in giving people second chances. Job opportunities are nationwide and employees are able to move up to become managers or even work in one of the corporate offices.

Adult Rehabilitation Centres
Some shops are associated with an Adult Rehabilitation Centre (ARC) where men and women make a 6-month rehabilitation commitment to live and work at the ARC residence. They are unpaid, but they are provided with room and board. Many ARCs are male-only. The program is primarily to combat addiction. They work at the warehouse, store or residence. This is referred to as "work therapy". They attend classes, twelve-step programs and chapel services as a part of their rehabilitation. The Army advertises these programs on their collection trucks with the slogan "Doing the Most Good". The general design pattern is that an ARC is associated with a main store and warehouse. Donations are consolidated from other stores and donation sites, sorted and priced, and then distributed back out to the branch stores. Low-quality donated items are sold at the warehouse dock in a "dock sale".

Hadleigh Farm Colony
Farmland at Hadleigh in Essex was acquired in 1891 to provide training for men referred from Salvation Army shelters. It featured market gardens, orchards and two brickfields. It was mentioned in the Royal Commission report of 1909 appointed to consider Poor Laws. 7,000 trainees had passed through its doors by 1912 with more than 60% subsequently finding employment.

Other

The Salvation Army operates children's summer camps, Silvercrest Residences, and adult day care centres. It has headquarter offices internationally, nationally and for each territory and division. Some of the other facilities include:
 Homeless hostels
 Residential addiction dependency programs
 Children's homes
 Homes for elderly persons
 Mother and baby homes
 Women's and men's refuge centres
 General hospitals
 Schools
 Maternity hospitals
 After School Programs
 Food Pantries
 Overnight Warming Stations
 Cooling Stations

Beliefs

The official mission statement reads:

The Salvation Army, an international movement, is an evangelical part of the universal Christian church. Its message is based on the Bible. Its ministry is motivated by the love of God. Its mission is to preach the gospel of Jesus Christ and to meet human needs in His name without discrimination.

Early beliefs of the Salvation Army were influenced by a book Helps to Holiness, which was to influence spiritual life of the Army for a generation. The sacred text of the Salvation Army is the Bible and the beliefs of the Salvation Army rest upon these eleven doctrines:

 We believe that the Scriptures of the Old and New Testaments were given by inspiration of God; and that they only constitute the Divine rule of Christian faith and practice.
 We believe that there is only one God, who is infinitely perfect, the Creator, Preserver, and Governor of all things, and who is the only proper object of religious worship.
 We believe that there are three persons in the Godhead – the Father, the Son and the Holy Ghost – undivided in essence and co-equal in power and glory.
 We believe that in the person of Jesus Christ, the Divine and human natures are united, so that He is truly and properly God and truly and properly man.
 We believe that our first parents were created in a state of innocency, but by their disobedience, they lost their purity and happiness; and that in consequence of their fall all men have become sinners, totally depraved, and as such are justly exposed to the wrath of God.
 We believe that the Lord Jesus Christ has, by His suffering and death, made an atonement for the whole world so that whosoever believes in him will not perish but have eternal life.
 We believe that repentance towards God, faith in our Lord Jesus Christ and regeneration by the Holy Spirit are necessary to salvation.
 We believe that we are justified by grace, through faith in our Lord Jesus Christ; and that he that believeth hath the witness in himself.
 We believe that continuance in a state of salvation depends upon continued obedient faith in Christ.
 We believe that it is the privilege of all believers to be wholly sanctified, and that their whole spirit and soul and body may be preserved blameless unto the coming of our Lord Jesus Christ.
 We believe in the immortality of the soul; in the resurrection of the body; in the general judgment at the end of the world; in the eternal happiness of the righteous; and in the endless punishment of the wicked.

The denomination does not celebrate the Christian sacraments of Baptism and Holy Communion. The International Spiritual Life Commission opinion on Baptism is that enrolment as a Soldier by accepting the call to discipleship should be followed by a lifetime of continued obedient faith in Christ. The Commission's considered option of Holy Communion is that God's grace is readily accessible in all places and at all times, although Salvationists may participate in Holy Communion if attending a service of worship in another Christian denomination if the host Church allows. Although its officers conduct marriages, it holds a traditional Protestant belief that marriage was not instituted by Christ and therefore is not a sacrament. The mercy seat is a focal point in a Salvation Army Church, symbolising God's call to his people, and a place for commitment and communion, and is available for anyone to kneel at in prayer.

Worship services
There is no requirement for anyone attending a service to be a member of the Salvation Army in any capacity (as a Soldier, Adherent or Officer) and services in Salvation Army churches feature a variety of activities:
 The service often begins with a greeting from the Minister.
 Hymns are sung, accompanied by backing music.
 There is a scripture reading from the Bible.
 Prayers are led by the Minister leading the service.
 Depending on demand, a Sunday School may be run in another room.
 A collection is held to receive a financial offering, either loose money or coins in a cartridge envelope. This is sometimes referred to as "Tithes and Offerings".
 The congregation sings the doxology.
 A sermon on the Bible reading is then given.
 The service concludes with a benediction.

Local corps usually sing contemporary worship music songs in Sunday worship services as well as traditional hymns from the official Songbook of the Salvation Army, and music is sometimes still accompanied by a brass band. Many American corps have adopted a mainstream Christian format with video screens showing words to music so that the audience can sing along. Though worship services usually no longer include a brass band, some Salvation Army corps instead use small ensembles of musicians. The early Salvation Army bands were known for their excitement and public appeal, and the modern ensemble keeps to this ideology. Traditional hymns are blended with other musical pieces from Christian Music Publishers such as Vineyard Music, Hillsong, and Planet Shakers to name but a few.

Soldier's Covenant

The Soldier's Covenant is the creed of the Salvation Army. All members of the church and congregants are required to subscribe to this creed; every person has to sign the document before they can become enrolled as a Soldier. Members have traditionally been referred to as "soldiers" of Christ. These were formerly known as the "Articles of War", and include "Having received with all my heart the salvation offered to me by the tender mercy of God, I do here and now acknowledge God the Father to be my King; God the Son, Jesus Christ our Lord, to be my Savior; and God the Holy Spirit to be my Guide, Comforter and Strength, and I will, by His help, love, serve, worship and obey this glorious God through time and in eternity."

Positional Statements
Positional Statements describe Salvation Army policy on various social and moral issues, are carefully considered and subject to review. They are derived from work by the International Moral and Social Issues Council. The Salvation Army opposes euthanasia and assisted suicide. Its official stance on abortion is that "The Salvation Army believes in the sanctity of all human life and considers each person to be of infinite value and each life a gift from God to be cherished, nurtured and redeemed. Human life is sacred because it is made in the image of God and has an eternal destiny. (Genesis 1:27) Sacredness is not conferred, nor can it be taken away by human agreement." The Salvation Army official stance admitted in 2010 exceptions in cases such as rape and incest: "In addition, rape and incest are brutal acts of dominance violating women physically and emotionally. This situation represents a special case for the consideration of termination as the violation may be compounded by the continuation of the pregnancy." It is also against the death penalty: "The Salvation Army recognises that the opinions of Salvationists are divided on the moral acceptability of capital punishment and its effectiveness as a deterrent. However, to advocate in any way the continuance or restoration of capital punishment in any part of the world would be inconsistent with the Army's purposes and contrary to the Army's belief that all human life is sacred and that each human being, however wretched, can become a new person in Christ."

In 2012, the Salvation Army published a "Positional Statement on Homosexuality" after receiving adverse publicity about their position on homosexuality.

On 8 December 2017, the Salvation Army released an International Positional Statement on racism which says that racism is "fundamentally incompatible with the Christian conviction that all people are made in the image of God and are equal in value. The Salvation Army believes that the world is enriched by a diversity of cultures and ethnicities."

Community services

Disaster relief

In the United States, the Salvation Army's first major forays into disaster relief resulted from the tragedies of the Galveston Hurricane of 1900 and the 1906 San Francisco earthquake. The Salvationists' nationwide appeals for financial and material donations yielded tremendous support, enabling the Army to provide assistance to thousands. General Evangeline Booth, when she offered the services of Salvationists to President Woodrow Wilson during the First World War, thrust Salvation Army social and relief work to newer heights. Today the Salvation Army is best known for its charitable efforts.

The Salvation Army is a nongovernmental relief agency and is usually among the first to arrive with help after natural or man-made disasters. They have worked to alleviate suffering and help people rebuild their lives. After the Indian Ocean tsunami in 2004, they arrived immediately at some of the worst disaster sites to help retrieve and bury the dead. Since then they have helped rebuild homes and construct new boats for people to recover their livelihood. Members were prominent among relief organisations after Hurricane Hugo and Hurricane Andrew and other such natural disasters in the United States. In August 2005, they supplied drinking water to poor people affected by the heat wave in the United States. Later in 2005 they responded to hurricanes Katrina and Rita. They helped the victims of an earthquake in Indonesia in May 2006.

Since Hurricane Katrina struck the Gulf Coast, the Salvation Army has allocated donations of more than $365 million to serve more than 1.7 million people in nearly every state. The Army's immediate response to Hurricane Katrina included the mobilisation of more than 178 canteen feeding units and 11 field kitchens which together served more than 5.7 million hot meals, 8.3 million sandwiches, snacks and drinks. Its SATERN (Salvation Army Team Emergency Radio Network) network of amateur ham-radio operators picked up where modern communications left off to help locate more than 25,000 survivors. Salvation Army pastoral care counsellors were on hand to comfort the emotional and spiritual needs of 277,000 individuals. As part of the overall effort, Salvation Army officers, employees and volunteers have contributed more than 900,000 hours of service.

The Salvation Army was one of the first relief agencies on the scene of the September 11 attacks in New York City in 2001. They also provided prayer support for families of missing people.

The Salvation Army, along with the American National Red Cross, Southern Baptist Convention, and other disaster relief organisations are national members of the National Voluntary Organisations Active in Disaster (NVOAD).

Also among the disaster relief capabilities is the Red Shield Defence Services, often called the SallyMan for short. Their efforts are similar to that of a chaplain offering cold drinks, hot drinks, and some biscuits for the soldiers of the military. If a SallyMan is on deployment, locals are offered a share in the produce.

Around the world, the Salvation Army have Emergency Services Support Units throughout the country and Emergency Disaster Services in the United States. These are mobile canteen vehicles providing food and other welfare to members of the Emergency Services such as at bushfires, floods, land search, and other both large- and small-scale emergency operations undertaken by Police, Fire, Ambulance and State Emergency Service members, and the general public affected by these events. Volunteers and officers run the canteen service. They respond when emergency services have been on the scene for more than four hours or where four or more Fire vehicles are responding.

Family Tracing Service
The Family Tracing Service (sometimes known as the Missing Persons Service) was established in 1885, and the service is now available in most of the countries where The Salvation Army operates. The Tracing Service's objective is to restore (or to sustain) family relationships where contact has been lost, whether recently or in the distant past. Thousands of people are traced every year on behalf of their relatives.

Youth groups

The Salvation Army includes many youth groups, which primarily consist of its Sunday schools and the Scout and Guide packs. The Scout and Guide packs are affiliated and sponsored by the Salvation Army but are open units allowing anyone to join. These units/pack observe Christian standards and encourage young people to investigate and develop in their Christian faith. Some territories have Salvation Army Guards and Legions Association (SAGALA). In the United States these internal youth groups that are specifically for girls are known as Girl Guards (older girls) and Sunbeams (younger girls). Adventure Corps serves boys who are enrolled in school for first through eighth grades, and is sometimes separated into Rangers (6th–8th Grade) and Explorers (5th Grade and younger).

Alove UK
In the 21st century, the Salvation Army in the United Kingdom created a branch for the youth, called Alove, the Salvation Army for a new generation. Its purpose is to free the youth of the church and their communities to express themselves and their faith in their own ways. Its mission statement is "Calling a generation to dynamic faith, radical lifestyle, adventurous mission and a fight for justice". It emphasises worship, discipleship, missions, and social action. Alove is a member of the National Council for Voluntary Youth Services (NCVYS).

Work Against Exploitation 
The Salvation Army works with a specialist team in partnership with the UK service Modern Slavery Helpline (telephone 0800 0121 700) to help people at risk of exploitation. Work is also done assisting homeless people by running 461 hostels and 20 refugee programmes.

COVID-19 relief 
In 2020, during the COVID-19 pandemic, The Salvation Army donated 224,603,024 meals and 1,822,412 PPE supply kits in the United States.

History

The Salvation Army was founded in London's East End in 1865 by one-time Methodist Reform Church minister William Booth and his wife Catherine Booth as the East London Christian Mission, and this name was used until 1878. The name "The Salvation Army" developed from an incident on 19 and 20 May. William Booth was dictating a letter to his secretary George Scott Railton and said, "We are a volunteer army." Bramwell Booth heard his father and said, "Volunteer! I'm no volunteer, I'm a regular!" Railton was instructed to cross out the word "volunteer" and substitute the word "salvation". The Salvation Army was modelled after the military, with its own flag (or colours) and its own hymns, often with words set to popular and folkloric tunes sung in the pubs. Booth and the other soldiers in "God's Army" would wear the Army's own uniform, for meetings and ministry work. He became the "General" and his other ministers were given appropriate ranks as "officers". Other members became "soldiers".

When William Booth became known as the General, Catherine was known as the "Mother of The Salvation Army". William Booth's early motivation for The Salvation Army was to convert poor Londoners such as prostitutes, gamblers and alcoholics to Christianity, while Catherine spoke to the wealthier people, gaining financial support for their work. She also acted as a religious minister, which was unusual at the time. The Foundation Deed of the Christian Mission states that women had the same rights to preach as men. William Booth described the organisation's approach: "The three 'S's' best expressed the way in which the Army administered to the 'down and outs': first, soup; second, soap; and finally, salvation."

In 1880, the Salvation Army started its work in three other countries: Australia, Ireland, and the United States. Salvationists set out for the US in 1880. When George Scott Railton and his team arrived they started work in Harry Hill's Variety Theatre on 14 March 1880. The first notable convert was Ashbarrel Jimmie who had so many convictions for drunkenness that the judge sentenced him to attend the Salvation Army. The corps in New York were founded as a result of Jimmys' rehabilitation. It was not always an Officer of The Salvation Army who started the Salvation Army in a new country; sometimes Salvationists emigrated to countries and started operating as "the Salvation Army" on their own authority. When the first official officers arrived in Australia and the United States, they found groups of Salvationists already waiting for them and started working with each other. Australia was the place where the Army's organised social work began on 8 December 1883 with the establishment of a home for ex-convicts. 

In 1891 Booth established a farm colony in Hadleigh, Essex which allowed people to escape the overcrowded slums in London's East End. A fully working farm with its own market-gardens, orchards and milk production, it provided training in basic building trades and household work.

The Salvation Army's main converts were at first alcoholics, morphine addicts, prostitutes and other "undesirables" unwelcome in polite Christian society, which helped prompt the Booths to start their own church. The Booths did not include the use of sacraments (mainly baptism and Holy Communion) in the Army's form of worship, believing that many Christians had come to rely on the outward signs of spiritual grace rather than on grace itself. Other beliefs are that its members should completely refrain from drinking alcohol (Holy Communion is not practised), smoking, taking illegal drugs and gambling. Its soldiers wear a uniform tailored to the country in which they work; the uniform can be white, grey, navy, fawn and are even styled like a sari in some areas. Any member of the public is welcome to attend their meetings. 

As the Salvation Army grew rapidly in the late 19th century, it generated opposition in England. Opponents, grouped under the name of the Skeleton Army, disrupted Salvation Army meetings and gatherings, with tactics such as throwing rocks, bones, rats, and tar as well as physical assaults on members of the Salvation Army. Much of this was led by pub owners who were losing business because of the Army's opposition to alcohol and targeting of the frequenters of saloons and public houses.

In 1882 the Salvation Army was established in Asia with the first outpost in India. The Army also established outposts in Australia in 1879, Japan in 1895 and China in 1915.

The Salvation Army's reputation in the United States improved as a result of its disaster relief efforts following the Galveston Hurricane of 1900 and the 1906 San Francisco earthquake. 

Today, in the U.S. alone, over 25,000 volunteer bell ringers with red kettles are stationed near retail stores during the weeks preceding Christmas for fundraising. The church remains a highly visible and sometimes controversial presence in many parts of the world.

The Salvation Army was one of the original six organisations that made up the USO, along with the YMCA, YWCA, National Catholic Community Services, National Jewish Welfare Board, and National Travelers Aid Association.

National Salvation Army week was created by President Dwight D. Eisenhower on 24 November 1954, encouraging people to honour the Salvation Army for its work in the United States throughout the past seventy-five years.

History of Doughnut Day
In 1917, over 250 Salvation Army volunteers went overseas to France to provide supplies and baked goods, including doughnuts, to American soldiers. The women who served doughnuts to the troops fried them in soldiers' helmets. They were known as "Doughnut Lassies" and are credited with popularising doughnuts in the United States. National Doughnut Day is now celebrated on the first Friday of June every year, starting in Chicago in 1938, to honour those who served doughnuts to soldiers during World War I.

Salvation Navy
In 1911, New York City architect Bradford Gilbert donated a yacht, The Jerry McAuley, to the Salvation Army. Jerry McAuley was a reformed criminal who founded the McAuley Water Street Mission (now the New York City Rescue Mission) in Lower Manhattan; he was also Mrs. Gilbert's first husband. This 35 foot powerboat with two cabins was the first vessel in the Salvation Navy in America; there were already two or three such vessels in Scandinavia. Its purpose is "to cruise the Atlantic coast, north in the summer and south in the winter, doing missionary work among the seamen of the ports." There was a six person crew; the captain was evangelist Major Nils Erikson.

Safeguarding Work 
The involvement of the Salvation Army in work to combat slavery and human trafficking can be traced back to William Booth publishing a letter in The War Cry in 1885. The same year an escapee from a prostitution house arrived at the door of the Salvation Army headquarters and sought help from Bramwell Booth. 

An early precursor to the Salvation Army becoming involved in safeguarding work was Catherine Booth writing to Queen Victoria regarding a Parliamentary bill for the protection of girls. Safeguarding legislation was strengthened by a new Act of Parliament, the "Public General Act, an Act to make further provision for the protection of women and girls, the suppression of brothels, and other purposes, (otherwise known as the Criminal Law Amendment Act 1885)", which received Royal Assent on 14 August 1885 The Salvation Army was involved in getting this Act passed. Work included a petition (numbering 340,000 signatures deposited on the floor of the House of Commons by eight uniformed Salvationists), mass meetings and an investigation into child prostitution. W. T. Stead of the Pall Mall Gazette launched a campaign in 1885 by writing articles on The Maiden Tribute of Modern Babylon to expose the extent of child prostitution which involved procuring a girl, Eliza for £5. She was cared for by the Army, taken to France and subsequently testified as a key witness at the trial of Stead and Rebecca Jarrett (the prostitute who had arranged the "sale" of Eliza) at Bow Street. Both were sentenced to six months in prison. 

The newly founded Salvation Army in Japan also encountered child prostitution, derived from a system of Debt Bondage. While an imperial ordinance (written in classical Japanese which few could understand) declared the girls right to freedom, the pioneer Salvationist Gunpei Yamamuro rewrote it in colloquial speech. His wife Kiye took charge of a girls home to provide accommodation for any girl wishing to give up prostitution. An imperial ordinance passed on 2 October 1900 stated that any woman who wished to give up prostitution only had to go to the nearest Police station and ask.

Organisational structure

As of 23 October 2016 the Salvation Army operates in 128 countries and provides services in 175 different languages. For administrative purposes, the Salvation Army divides itself geographically into 5 zones: Americas and Caribbean, Europe, South Asia, South Pacific and East Asia, and Africa, and the zonal departments at International Headquarters in London, United Kingdom are the main administrative link with territories and commands

These are further divided into territories, which are then sub-divided into divisions. Some territories cover several countries (like Italy and Greece) while some countries may have several territories (Australia Eastern and Australia Southern) In larger areas, regional and area commands are also introduced as subdivisions of divisions. Each territory has an administrative hub known as territorial headquarters (THQ). Likewise, each division has a divisional headquarters (DHQ). Each of these territories is led by a territorial commander who receives orders from the Salvation Army's international headquarters in London. A territory is typically led by an officer holding the rank of colonel (for small territories) or commissioner for larger territories. In some countries, the work of The Salvation Army may be called a command, led by a command commander. A larger command is typically led by an officer holding the rank of colonel. There is a Women's Ministries division devoted to supporting women in ministry which has 766,369 members, founded as the Home League in 1907. Red Shield Defence Services work with the Armed Services in order to provide assistance such as refreshments, soap, chewing gum, toothpaste and sewing kits. "Waves of Transformation" is a water resources project assisting deprived communities. The International Spiritual Life Commission is convened by the General to examine and identify aspects relevant to the spiritual growth of both the Church and individual Salvationists. Reliance Bank is the financial services arm of the Salvation Army, providing bank accounts, loans and mortgages. It is registered with the UK banking regulator, the Financial Conduct Authority, registration number 204537. SAGIC Insurance is the insurance services arm of the Army, offering various types of policy, a nationwide removals service and a conveyancing service for buying and selling houses.

Heritage Centres 
Heritage Centres are museums run by the Salvation Army which have exhibits and historical documents related to the history and work of the organisation. Heritage Centres collect, preserve, catalogue, research and share material about the life and work of The Salvation Army. The International Heritage Centre in London can provide details of premises in any specific territory. Much of what happens at the High Council is governed by British Law, as set out in the Salvation Army Acts (1931 to 1968). The 2013 High Council consists of 118 members (62 women and 56 men) made up of the Chief of Staff, all the active commissioners and territorial leaders (some territories are led by colonels), each of whom was summoned by the Chief of the Staff for the sole purpose of electing a new General. The International Heritage Centre in London, England is located at the William Booth Memorial Training College and provides details of premises in any specific territory and manages the Salvation Army's archival Twitter feed. Another training college for officers is the Catherine Booth Bible College based at Winnipeg, Canada which was authorised in August 1983 by the Manitoba Legislature to grant academic degrees. International Development Services team work with some of the poorest communities around the world and manage the Salvation Army's project-based Twitter feed.

Relevant Legislation 
Various Constituting Instruments apply to different aspects of the work of the Salvation Army. Legislation passed in the United Kingdom Parliament covered the following:
 The Salvation Army Act, 1931 contained several provisions, firstly that the High Council be convened to elect a new General when the role became vacant, and reorganised custody of property held in Charitable Trust by the foundation of the Salvation Army Trustee Company being formed to hold all property previously vested in the General. Section 4 relates to a servin General giving notice of their intention to retire.
 The Salvation Army Act 1963 established a non-contributory pension fund for Officers of the Salvation Army.
 The Salvation Army Act 1968 relates to management of Salvation Army trusts.
 The Salvation Army Act 1980 revised and consolidated the constitution of the Salvation Army to continue its work.
 Schedule 1 covered the Religious Doctrines of the Army
 Schedule 2 related to Common Investment Schemes and the establishment of a Central Finance Council
 Part V covered the Election of the General

Membership 
Statistics for membership from the 2018 Year Book, are 111,859 employees, 17,168 Active Officers, 9,775 Retired Officers, 1,050 Cadets, 175,811 Adherents, 411,327 Junior Soldiers and 1,182,100 Senior Soldiers. Previous membership statistics (as quoted from 2010 year book) include 16,938 active and 9,190 retired officers, 39,071 Corps Cadets and more than 4.5 million volunteers. Members of the Salvation Army also include "adherents"; these are people who do not make the commitment to be a soldier but who recognise the Salvation Army as their church. (According to the 2006 Salvation Army year book, in the United States there are 85,148 senior soldiers and 28,377 junior soldiers, 17,396 adherents and around 60,000 employees.) Further information is available from the Salvation Army International website.

Leadership 
General Brian Peddle has been the world leader of the Salvation Army since 3 August 2018.

International Congress of the Salvation Army 
The International Congress of the Salvation Army is normally held every 10 years as a conference for all Salvationists from around the world to meet. The first such conference took place in London, UK, from 28 May to 4 June 1886, and subsequent Congressional meetings were held sporadically until 1904 and then 1990. The seventh International Congress in Atlanta, Georgia, United States, from 28 June to 2 July 2000, was the first held outside of the UK.
The latest International Congress was held in London on 1–5 July 2015, in commemoration of the 150th anniversary of the Salvation Army's founding.

Presence in Russia 
In Russia the Army was founded around 1917 and the Army struggled on until 1922 at which point the situation had become extremely challenging. A Moscow court ruled that the Salvation Army was a paramilitary organisation subject to expulsion. In October 2006, the European Court of Human Rights ruled the decision illegal. The Salvation Army International website lists the Russian Federation, now part of the Territory of Eastern Europe.

Presence in China 
William Booth's dying wish for the Salvation Army to be established in China was fulfilled in a pledge made in 1912 by Bramwell Booth to his father. In 1915 the first officers were sent, and during the 1931 famine fed 100,000 people daily. Following political difficulties by 1952 the Army withdrew from the country but work still continues in the provinces of Macau and Hong Kong, as well as in Taiwan.

Symbols

Flag

The Salvation Army flag is a symbol of the Army's war against sin and social evils. The red on the flag symbolises the blood shed by Jesus Christ, the yellow for the fire of the Holy Spirit and the blue for the purity of God the Father.

Crest

The oldest official emblem of The Salvation Army is the crest.

In 1878 Captain W. H. Ebdon suggested a logo, and in 1879 it was to be found on the letterhead of the Salvation Army Headquarters. The captain's suggested design was changed only slightly and a crown was added.

The Army's crest contains Biblical references though its symbolism:

Red Shield
The Red Shield has its origins in Salvation Army work during wartime. At the end of the 19th century, Staff-Captain Mary Murray was sent by William Booth to support British troops serving in the Boer War in South Africa. Then, in 1901, this same officer was given the task of establishing the Naval and Military League, the forerunner of the Red Shield Services.

Salvation Army officers serving in the Red Shield Services in wartime performed many functions. The Doughnut Girls of World War I are an early example, serving refreshments to troops in the trenches. They also provided first aid stations, ambulances, chaplaincy, social clubs, Christian worship and other front-line services.

This symbol is still used in Blue Shield Services that serve the British Armed Forces but it is widely used as a simple, more readily identifiable symbol in many Salvation Army settings. It is common to see the Red Shield used on casual Salvation Army uniform. It is now official Salvation Army policy in the UK that the red shield should be used as the external symbol of the Salvation Army, with the Crest only being used internally. Therefore, any new Salvation Army building will now have the red shield on the outside rather than the crest which certainly would have been used on its Corps (church) buildings. This was "imposed" in the UK by the Senior Management with little or no consultation with members. Not all have welcomed this change.

In Australia, the Red Shield has become one of the country's most identified and trusted symbols, leading the Australian Salvation Army to prefer to use this symbol over the logo on its uniform, corps buildings and advertising materials. In the 5th volume of Australian Superbrands it was recorded that "Research reveals that the popular Salvation Army slogan 'Thank God for the Salvos' has almost total recognition amongst the Australian public, achieving 93 per cent aided awareness".

Uniform

Salvation Army officers, cadets (trainee officers) and soldiers often wear uniforms. The idea that they should do so originated with Elijah Cadman, who, at the Salvation Army's "War Congress" in August 1878, said, "I would like to wear a suit of clothes that would let everyone know I meant war to the teeth and salvation for the world". The uniform identifies the wearer as a Salvationist and a Christian. It also symbolises availability to those in need. The uniform takes many forms internationally but is characterised by the 'S' insignia for 'Salvation' and carries the meaning 'Saved to Serve', or 'Saved to Save'. Different colours and styles represent different ranks including soldiers, cadets, lieutenants, captains, majors, colonels, commissioner, and even the General.

Characteristics of the uniform vary between ranks where accessories (the official term is "trimmings") comprise epaulettes and hexagonal lapel patches.
The uniform varies with the position and rank:
 Soldier: plain black epaulettes (Corps name woven into base of epaulette) and black lapel patch with "S"
 Musician: plain blue or black epaulettes and lapel patch with "S"
 Cadet: black epaulette with 1 or 2 red bars corresponding to number of years of training and black lapel patch with "S"
 Officer ranks:
 Lieutenant: red epaulette with one silver star and red lapel patch with "S"
 Captain: red epaulette with two silver stars and red lapel patch with "S"
 Major: red epaulette with silver crest and red lapel patch with "S"

Other letters are substituted to conform with local language. The words "The Salvation Army" are woven into the fabric of the uniform as a logo on shirts, blouses and jackets.

Tartan

Since 1983 there has been an official Salvation Army tartan. It was designed by Captain Harry Cooper, for the Perth Citadel Corps centenary commemoration in Scotland. It is based upon the colours of the Salvation Army flag, with which it shares the same symbolism. It is rarely seen outside Scotland.

Salute
The Salvation Army has a unique form of salute which involves raising the right hand above shoulder-height with the index finger pointing upwards. It signifies recognition of a fellow citizen of heaven, and a pledge to do everything possible to get others to heaven also. In the case of saluting in response to applause, in circumstances such as a musical festival or being applauded for a speech, it also signifies that the Salvationist wishes to give Glory to God and not themselves. In some instances, the salute is accompanied with a shout of 'hallelujah!'

Red kettles

In many countries, the Salvation Army is recognised during the Christmas season with its volunteers and employees who stand outside of businesses and play/sing Christmas carols, or ring bells to inspire passers-by to place donations of cash and cheques inside red kettles. A tradition has developed in the United States in which, in some places, gold coins or rings or bundles of large bills are anonymously inserted into the kettles. This was first recorded in 1982, in Crystal Lake, Illinois, a suburb of Chicago. The red kettles are not only used during the Christmas season though.  They are used throughout the year at other fundraising events, such as on National Doughnut Day in the U.S.  On this day, some doughnut shops that teamed up with the Salvation Army have a red kettle set up for donations. Each corps has a specific goal chosen for them by DHQ [Divisional Headquarters] which differs based on size and capability

Red Shield Appeal and Self-Denial Appeal
The Red Shield Appeal and Self-Denial Appeal are annual fundraising campaigns in some territories, such as the UK and Australia. Each year, officers, soldiers, employees and volunteers take to the streets worldwide to participate in door-to-door or street collections. The money raised is specifically channelled towards The Salvation Army's social work in each respective territory. Within the territory defined by the United Kingdom and Ireland (UKIT) this collection is known as the Annual Appeal, and it often carries another name that the general public would more readily know – in 2012 becoming The Big Collection.

Music playing

As the popularity of the organisation grew and Salvationists worked their way through the streets of London attempting to convert individuals, they were sometimes confronted with unruly crowds. A family of musicians (the Frys, from Alderbury, Wiltshire) began working with the Army as their "bodyguards" and played music to distract the crowds. In 1891 a Salvation Army band attempted to parade and play music in Eastbourne, Sussex, England.  This was in contravention of local by-laws and resulted in the arrest of 9 Salvationists. Unperturbed the Army continued to parade in defiance of the law, with the aim of gathering support for a change in legislation.  Over the next few months the situation in the town escalated to such an extent that there were riots, and mounted police had to be called in from surrounding areas to try to maintain order.

The tradition of having musicians available continued and eventually grew into standard brass bands. These are still seen in public at Army campaigns, as well as at other festivals, parades and at Christmas. Across the world the brass band has been an integral part of the Army's ministry and an immediately recognisable symbol to Salvationists and non-Salvationists alike. The Salvation Army also has choirs; these are known as Songster Brigades, normally comprising the traditional soprano, alto, tenor and bass singers. The premier Songster Brigade in the Salvation Army is the International Staff Songsters (ISS). The standard of playing is high and the Army operates bands at the international level, such as the International Staff Band (a brass band) which is the equal of professional ensembles although it does not participate in the brass band contest scene, and territorial levels such as the New York Staff Band. Some professional brass players and contesting brass band personnel have Salvation Army backgrounds. Many Salvation Army corps have brass bands that play at Salvation Army meetings, although not all. The Salvation Army also fielded large concertina bands.  From the turn of the (20th) century to the Second World War between a third and a half of all SA officers in Britain played concertina.  For an evangelist the concertina's portability, its ability to play both melody and chords, and most especially the fact that the player can sing or speak while playing, were all distinct advantages over brass instruments.

The Army tradition in music is to use the popular idiom of the day to reach people for Jesus. The Army's Joy Strings were a hit pop group in the 1960s and early 1970s in the UK and beyond, reaching the charts and being featured on national television. Another popular band is The Insyderz, an American ska-core group popular in the 1990s and early 2000s. Hundreds of bands carry on this Salvation Army tradition, such as New Zealand's Moped, Chamberlain, Vatic, Agent C, and The Lads; England's Electralyte; Australia's Soteria Music Ministries, Summer Carnival Band, Crown of Thorns and Escape; and America's transMission, The Singing Company, HAB, BurN, and CJD – Cookies, Juice, & Donuts. Saytunes is a website designed to encourage and promote these contemporary Salvation Army bands and artists. Another significant musical feature of the Salvation Army is its use of tambourines. With colourised ribbons representing the colours of the Salvation Army flag, timbrels play an integral facet of music in the Salvation army. They are mainly played by women.

Publications
The Salvation Army publishes books, magazines, and sheet music. Due to the way in which the Salvation Army is constituted, copyright of some Army publications is vested in the General of The Salvation Army, and not necessarily the original authors.

There are official social media accounts run by the Salvation Army on Twitter, Facebook groups run by Territories and Corps officers, and unofficial fan groups.

Books and magazines
 New Frontier Chronicle, news and networking for the Salvation Army
 Caring Magazine, curating conversation around issues of social concern

 The War Cry newspaper, first published in 1879 in the United Kingdom
 Faith and Friends magazine
 Salvationist magazine
 Word and Deed journal
 KidZone magazine
 Priority magazine
 Pipeline, The Salvation Army's news, features and opinion magazine AUE (discontinued)
 Onfire The Salvation Army's news, features and opinion magazine AUS (discontinued)
 Others The Salvation Army's news, features and opinion magazine (under newly unified Australian Territory)
 Adult And Family Ministries Songbook
 Kids Alive children's magazine
 Handbook of Doctrine
 Salvation Story (revised Handbook of Doctrine)
 The Salvation Army Yearbook 2018 (website page)
 Christian Mission Magazine
 Christian Mission Hymn Book
 Revive
 The Salvation Army Year Book 2018 (paperback) (e-book)
 Songbook of The Salvation Army (Standard Print) (Large Print)

Public Views 
In 1994, the Chronicle of Philanthropy, an industry publication, released the results of the largest study of charitable and non-profit organisation popularity and credibility. The study showed that The Salvation Army was ranked as the 4th "most popular charity/non-profit in America" of over 100 charities researched, with 47% of Americans over the age of 12 choosing 'Love' and 'Like A Lot' for The Salvation Army.

Honours
General Bramwell Booth instituted the Order of the Founder on 20 August 1917 and the first awards were made in 1920 to one Soldier and 15 Officers.
General George Carpenter founded the Order of Distinguished Auxiliary Service in 1941 to express the Salvation Army's gratitude for service given to the organisation by non-Salvationists.

Controversies

Stance on LGBT issues
Because the Salvation Army is a church, Title VII of the U.S. Civil Rights Act of 1964 allows it to inquire into people's religious beliefs in its hiring practices. The Salvation Army states that it does not "discriminate against hiring gays and lesbians for the majority of its roughly 55,000 jobs," but historically it has supported legislation which would allow it to deny employment and federally-funded services to lesbian, gay, bisexual, and transgender (LGBT) individuals.

In 1986, The Salvation Army campaigned throughout New Zealand against the Homosexual Law Reform Act 1986, which decriminalised homosexuality. In 2006, the Army released a statement regretting the ill feelings that persisted following this activity. It stated in part "We do understand though that The Salvation Army's official opposition to the Reform Bill was deeply hurtful to many, and are distressed that ill-feeling still troubles our relationship with segments of the gay community. We regret any hurt that may remain from that turbulent time and our present hope is to rebuild bridges of understanding and dialogue between our movement and the gay community."

In 1997, the city of San Francisco enacted a law requiring all companies doing business with the city government to extend domestic benefits to same-sex partners of employees.  In refusing to do so, the Salvation Army declined a US $3.5million contract. In 2001, the Salvation Army pressed the Bush Administration to exempt it and other religious groups from anti-discrimination legislation which it felt infringed on the organisation's religious freedoms. This request was denied, and was sharply rebuked by David Smith, then-spokesperson for the Human Rights Campaign. "Gays and lesbians are taxpayers, too," said Smith. "Their money should not be used by religious groups to fund discriminatory practices against them."

In February 2000, the Salvation Army in the United Kingdom publicly opposed the repeal of Section 28 of the Local Government Act 1988, which prevented local authorities from "intentionally promot[ing] homosexuality". 

The Salvation Army Western Territory approved a plan in October 2001 to start offering domestic partnership benefits to employees in same-sex relationships. Members of various evangelical Christian interest groups protested the decision. Focus on the Family founder James Dobson excoriated the Salvation Army for abandoning its "moral integrity" and urged his radio listeners to bombard the organisation's offices with phone calls and letters. The American Family Association also accused the Salvation Army of a "monstrous ... appeasement of sin" that resulted in a "betrayal of the church". In November 2001 the Salvation Army US-wide rescinded the Western Territory's decision with an announcement that it would only provide benefits coverage for different-sex spouses and dependent children of its employees.

In 2004, the Salvation Army said that it would close operations in New York City unless it was exempted from a municipal ordinance requiring them to offer benefits to gay employees' partners. The City Council refused to make the exemption. Mayor Michael R. Bloomberg's administration chose not to enforce the ordinance. The administration's right to decline to enforce the ordinance was upheld by the New York State Court of Appeals in 2006.

In 2008, a trans woman named Jennifer Gale died outside a church in Austin, Texas. A city council member attributed her death to workers at a Salvation Army shelter refusing to house her in the women's quarters. The city council member later partially retracted their statements, stating "The Salvation Army...do apparently have a policy of non-discrimination and they do not turn trans people away, but I'm not fully sold on their ability to actually understand the issue. If they are not full they will give trans people privacy (maybe they have private quarters of some sort), but if full and they are in an overflow shelter situation, as they were Tuesday night, I am under the impression that they will assign people according to their anatomy."

Between 2010 and 2013, various individuals and organisations critically noted a "position statement" with regard to "same-sex" "sexual orientations" published on the Salvation Army's website:

 Scripture forbids sexual intimacy between members of the same sex. The Salvation Army believes, therefore, that Christians whose sexual orientation is primarily or exclusively same-sex are called upon to embrace celibacy as a way of life. There is no scriptural support for same-sex unions as equal to, or as an alternative to, heterosexual marriage.

Likewise, there is no scriptural support for demeaning or mistreating anyone for reason of his or her sexual orientation. The Salvation Army opposes any such abuse.

In keeping with these convictions, the services of The Salvation Army are available to all who qualify, without regard to sexual orientation. [...]

According to a June 2012 article in The Atlantic, the position statement was subsequently "deleted". An article published by CTV News noted in December of the same year that "The site currently states that the organisation's position on homosexuality is 'under review.'"

On 15 December 2012, in Canada, Andrea Le Good noticed a Salvation Army bell-ringer carrying a sign reading "if you support gay rights: please do not donate". While the bell-ringer claimed he had permission from the charity to wear the sign, Salvation Army spokeswoman Kyla Ferns said that it had no part in the sign, and that the bell-ringer was pulled away immediately when the charity learned about it.

In November 2013 it was made known that the Salvation Army was referring LGBT individuals to one of several conversion therapy groups. As a response, the Salvation Army removed links to the conversion groups from their website.

In 2016, The Salvation Army withdrew support for an Australian safe schools program that focused on LGBT students, stating that "the provision of a government approved anti-bullying program needs to consider all high risk student groups."

In November 2019, according to The Dallas Morning News, "singer Ellie Goulding [...] threaten[ed] to cancel her performance at the Cowboys' Thanksgiving halftime show" out of concern for "the LGBTQ community" following negative responses to an Instagram post that she made promoting the organisation:

"Upon researching this, I have reached out to The Salvation Army and said that I would have no choice but to pull out unless they very quickly make a solid, committed pledge or donation to the LGBTQ community," she wrote. "I am a committed philanthropist as you probably know, and my heart has always been in helping the homeless, but supporting an anti-LGBTQ charity is clearly not something I would ever intentionally do. Thank you for drawing my attention to this."

The show "serves as the kickoff for the Salvation Army's yearly Red Kettle Campaign". Goulding later opted to perform.

The Salvation Army's response
A positional statement on the Salvation Army UK and Ireland site stated (but has since been taken down):

The positional statement is, however, intended explicitly for members of the Salvation Army and the Salvation Army mission statement as of 2013 states:

, activists were still calling on the Salvation Army to change its stance on LGBT issues, citing ongoing discrimination.

, the "Inclusion" page on the official UK website stated that the Salvation Army stands against homophobia and does not permit discrimination in its employment practices or delivery of care.

The USA Central Territory website, as of 2018, explicitly states that it serves and welcomes the LGBT community.

On the website of its USA division, the organisation currently maintains an informative and promotional document titled "The LGBTQ Community and The Salvation Army" in which it states (among other things) that it is "committed to serving the LGBTQ community"; "[w]hen a transgender person seeks help from us, we serve them in the same manner as any other person seeking assistance"; it "is an Equal Opportunity Employer" with regard to "sexual orientation, gender identity, gender expression" (et al.); and that it "provide[s] benefits to the spouses of employees in same-sex marriages".

Continuing criticism
In 2019, 2020, and 2021, The Salvation Army continued to be criticized in publications like Vox, Forbes, and Out, for homophobic and transphobic views and practices expressed by its leaders and policies, such as in public statements and lobbying.

Canadian charity work
During the 2010 Christmas season, the Salvation Army in Calgary, Alberta, refused to accept toys based on the Harry Potter and Twilight franchises because of a perceived conflict with the organisation's religious principles. One volunteer claimed that the toys were destroyed instead of being given to other agencies. The volunteer also criticised the Salvation Army for accepting violence-themed toys such as plastic rifles while not accepting Harry Potter or Twilight toys. A Salvation Army captain said that the toys were given to other organisations, not disposed of. This policy is however, not universal, as the Wetaskiwin corps of the Salvation Army has accepted Harry Potter toys. One captain called the series "a classic story of good winning over evil".

Also during the 2010 Christmas season, the Salvation Army in Vancouver, BC, came under fire from advocacy group Families Against Crime & Trauma (FACT) for a program that provided goodie bags to federal inmates for Christmas by playing Santa to incarcerated criminals. The advocacy group called on the public to cease donations to the Salvation Army. Families Against Crime & Trauma, which takes a hardline position against criminal rehabilitation, claimed the gifts were undeserved rewards that should instead go to the victims of crime and their families.  The Salvation Army responded that their prisoner visitation program was established over a century ago and that they provided these particular services as contractors to the federal and provincial government, and as such no charitable donations were spent on the program.

Proselytising during government-funded social service in New York
In 2004, the Salvation Army's New York division was named in a lawsuit filed by 18 current and former employees of its social service arm, claiming that the organisation asked about the religious and sexual habits of employees in programs funded by local and state government. One member claimed the organisation forced them to agree "to preach the Gospel of Jesus Christ". Proselytising or otherwise pursuing religious motives in a government-funded program is generally considered a violation of the Establishment Clause of the US Constitution. While the employment-discrimination portion of the lawsuit was dismissed in 2005, government agencies agreed in a 2010 settlement to set up monitoring systems to ensure that the Army did not violate church–state separation in its publicly funded projects. The organisation did not dispute allegations that nine-year-olds in a city-funded foster care program were put through a "confirmation-like" ceremony, where they were given Bibles and prayed over.

Australian sex abuse cases

From the 1940s to the 1980s the Salvation Army in Australia sheltered approximately 30,000 children. In 2006 the Australian division of the Salvation Army acknowledged that sexual abuse may have occurred during this time and issued an apology. In it, the Army explicitly rejected a claim, made by a party unnamed in the apology, that there were as many as 500 potential claimants.

In 2013 it was reported that private settlements totalling A$15.5 million had been made in Victoria relating to 474 abuse cases; a Salvation Army spokesman said that "This should not have happened and this was a breach of the trust placed in us" and that they were "deeply sorry" whilst claiming that the abuse was "the result of individuals and not a culture within the organisation".

The investigation also examined the Salvation Army's processes in investigating, disciplining, removing and transferring anyone accused of or found to have engaged in child sexual abuse in these homes. On 27 March 2014, the Royal Commission began an investigation into the handling by the Salvation Army (Eastern Territory) of claims of child sexual abuse between 1993 and 2014.

The Royal Commission published a case study report on the findings and recommendations for one of the above-mentioned case studies.

Unpaid labour in the UK
The Salvation Army has been criticised for making use of the UK Government's workfare schemes.

Racism guide
In November 2021, The Salvation Army released a guidance pamphlet titled "Let's Talk About Racism" which encouraged its members to "lament, repent and apologize for biases or racist ideologies held and actions committed." This was interpreted by critics as an endorsement of critical race theory, during a time of broader public controversy around CRT in the United States. In response, The Salvation Army called the accusations "sensationalist" and "simply not true", and that they had never told people to "apologize for the color of their skin" or "abandoned its Biblical beliefs". After the continued backlash they retracted the document and again stated that they do not endorse any ideology or belief system other than Christianity and reject the idea that "America is an inherently racist society". The anti-CRT group Color Us United promised to "continue its battle" with The Salvation Army despite these statements.

Rogue landlord allegations
In April 2022 an investigation by The Guardian and ITV news found serious problems at properties owned and rented out by the Salvation Army in Hadleigh, Essex. The investigation found that tenants had been exposed to "serious" hazards for at least seven years and that many of the properties were not in line with fire regulations. A 2014 survey, commissioned by the Salvation Army, found damp and breaches of fire regulations. Residents of one property reported a hole in their roof to Salvation Army's agent six years prior to the newspaper's investigation. A resident of one house said, "There's the damp problem, obviously the roof, because we need to keep the heat in the house not having it blowing up out the house. The windows and doors don't fit properly...(I) have to have the heating on 24 hours a day to keep the house warm (in the winter)." The managing director of the environmental health consultancy Building Forensics, Jeff Charlton, found mould on a wall next to the bed of an asthmatic child in another home.

Alan Read, the Salvation Army's managing director, met with residents in 2018 and issued an apology for neglecting them. Many of the 40 residents at the meeting were left with the impression they could be evicted if the Salvation Army could not afford to carry out repairs.

The local authority, Castle Point Borough Council, wrote to the Salvation Army in March 2019 warning it would take legal action over the condition of the properties. In 2022 The Guardian and ITV News found conditions within the homes had not improved since the Castle Point Borough Council's warning in 2019. The behaviour of the Salvation Army was described as a "sordid mess" by an environmental officer at the Council. Category one and category two hazards were found by the Council's environmental department. Category one hazards include risks of "death, permanent paralysis, permanent loss of consciousness, loss of a limb or serious fracture".

In April the local authority 2022 issued improvement notices to the Salvation Army, which was criticised for not carrying out repairs at the same time it was spending an estimated £32 million on a new territorial headquarters building in Southwark, London. The Salvation Army said the new territorial headquarters was funded by the sale of its old headquarters, not by donations or rental income from tenants.

The Salvation Army released a statement saying, "It is clear that we let down the tenants of Seaview Terrace and Mount Zion and we are deeply sorry. Considerable refurbishment and improvement work is already underway. We have employed a contractor as a Project Manager dedicated to Hadleigh and will be employing a Building Surveyor on a permanent basis to focus on Hadleigh going forward".

The MP for Castle Point, Rebecca Harris said she had repeated meetings with the Salvation Army over a number of years to try and get the church to improve living conditions. She said, "They kept making promises that failed to materialise."

Miscellaneous 
In 2004, the Army in the United States received a $1.6 billion donation in the will of Joan B. Kroc, the third wife of former McDonald's CEO Ray Kroc. This donation was among the larger individual philanthropic gifts ever given to a single organisation. The donation came with certain restrictions that caused some controversy.

In films
The Salvation Army is featured in many popular movies such as Guys and Dolls and Major Barbara, The Salvation Army is only briefly shown or discussed in these movies such as a bell ringer on the corner in the movie Maid in Manhattan and National Lampoon's Christmas Vacation, and briefly mentioned in Batman Begins.  Additionally, in Lord of War, a main character (an illegal gun merchant) claimed that the Salvation Army had been the only "army" he had not "supplied". L'Armée du salut (Salvation Army) was the title of a book written by Abdellah Taïa, which was adapted to film with the same title. A book detailing over 500 films in which the Salvation Army appears or is mentioned was published in 2020 entitled The Salvation Army at the Movies, written by Rob Kinnon-Brettle.

Film studio
The Salvation Army began producing silent films when they started their own film studio called The Limelight Department in 1892, which was the first in Australia. The original studio still stands today and is being preserved by the Salvation Army. One of the films included was a documentary called Inauguration of the Australian Commonwealth. In the years between 1898 and 1909, The Limelight Department produced over 300 films and documented Australia's Federation Ceremonies in 1909.

In music
The hit song Seven Nation Army was inspired by Jack White's childhood mispronunciation of the Salvation Army.

The song "Sally" by Sade is about the Salvation Army. In the song, the Army is personified as Sally, a woman who helps men through hard times. The song appears on their debut album Diamond Life, released in 1984.

The song The Preacher and the Slave was written by labor activist Joe Hill as a parody about the Salvation Army.  It has also been performed by Woody Guthrie, Pete Seeger and Utah Phillips.

See also

 The Salvation Army in Australia
 Limelight Department
 The Salvation Army, Australia Eastern Territory
 The Salvation Army, Australia Southern Territory
 The Salvation Army, Canada
 Booth University College
 Chalk Farm Salvation Army Band
 Chief of the Staff of The Salvation Army
 "Follow On" (hymn)
 Generals of The Salvation Army
 The Salvation Army Ray & Joan Kroc Corps Community Centers
 Maidenhead Citadel Band
 Salvation Army Team Emergency Radio Network
 Soldier in The Salvation Army
 The Salvation Army in Namibia
 The Salvation Army U.S.
 The Salvation Army U.S. Central Territory
 The Salvation Army U.S. Western Territory
 Salvation Army Waioli Tea Room
 World Vision
 Church Army
 Criminal Law Amendment Act 1885
 Salvation Army Boys Adventure Corps

References

Bibliography

 Cooper, David Paul. Notes on The Salvation Army: An East End History in Photographs.
 Eason, Andrew M. Roger J. Green, eds. (2012) Boundless Salvation: The Shorter Writings of William Booth. New York: Peter Lang.
 Eason, Andrew M. (2003) Women in God's Army: Gender and Equality in the Early Salvation Army. Waterloo: Wilfrid Laurier University Press. .
 
 Merritt, Major John G. Historical Dictionary of The Salvation Army (Scarecrow Press, 2006).

External links

 The Salvation Army International official website
 The Salvation Army United States official website
 The Salvation Army Emergency Disaster Services
 Timeline of Salvation Army development
 Salvation Army: – Association of Religion Data Archives
 

 
Protestant denominations
Religious organizations established in 1865
Workfare in the United Kingdom
Christian temperance movement
Anti-abortion organizations
Charity shops